Howard Swanson (August 18, 1907 – November 12, 1978) was an American composer. Swanson studied at the Cleveland Institute of Music and was then taught by Nadia Boulanger in Paris. He received fellowships, awards and prizes. His preference was for linear construction and lyrical works with subtle tonal centers. He was born in Atlanta, Georgia and died in New York City.

Many African-American composers have been lauded for the high quality of their song writing. Particularly praised are the songs of Howard Swanson. William Flanagan, reviewing three songs of Swanson, said, "They are authentic and in the best tradition of the song-writing art--sensitive, intimate, and evocative." Virgil Thomson said, "Howard Swanson is a composer whose work singers (and pianists, too) should look into. It is refined, sophisticated of line and harmony in a way not at all common among American music writers. His songs have an acute elaboration of thought and an intensity for feeling that recall Fauré." Swanson's friendship with poet Langston Hughes and his subsequent setting of Hughes poetry gives insight not only to the music of the African-American community, but also gives an intimate view to the psyche of the poet. Swanson consulted the poet with regularity while setting his poetry. His compositions are considered by many to be the definitive interpretations of the poet's work. His individual song settings of the poems "Joy," "In Time of Silver Rain," "Night Song," "Pierrot," and "The Negro Speaks of Rivers" (performed by Helen Thigpen and David Allen in 1950) reflect his intimate acquaintance with the inner workings of Hughes poetry.

References

1907 births
1978 deaths
20th-century American composers
20th-century American male musicians
20th-century classical composers
African-American classical composers
American classical composers
African-American male classical composers
American male classical composers
Cleveland Institute of Music alumni